Crime Zone (also known as Calles Peligrossas in Peru) is a 1989 American-Peruvian science fiction action film directed by Luis Llosa, written by Daryl Haney and starring David Carradine, Peter Nelson, Sherilyn Fenn, and Michael Shaner. Carradine plays a mysterious stranger who recruits young lovers in an illicit romance (Nelson and Fenn) to commit a crime spree in a futuristic police state, while promising them an avenue for escape. The film was executive produced by Roger Corman, who came up with the original concept.

Due to a perceived lack of Peruvian qualities, it was better received by American than Peruvian critics. Corman's New Concorde co-produced and distributed it. After its Los Angeles premiere, it was released on VHS by MGM/UA.

Plot 
In the fictional country Soleil, a brutal police state at war with Frodan, the government sets up a criminal, Hector, who walks into a police trap. Hector is captured alive at the behest of the police chief and is executed live on television after a brief show trial. Bone, who has recently lost his job at a cryogenics facility for not showing the proper respect to authority, meets Helen, a woman forced into prostitution at the government-sanctioned whorehouse. They are immediately attracted to each other and begin an illegal romance despite several close calls with the police. Bone's friend Creon becomes jealous of their relationship and demands that Bone share Helen with him; disgusted, Bone refuses, and they eventually come to blows over Creon's behavior.

After he observes Bone and Helen engage in petty theft, a mysterious man named Jason offers them passage to Frodan if they will steal records from a secure facility disguised as a hospital. Although suspicious, they accept and successfully deliver the information to Jason, who attempts to delay their reward and talk them into further criminal acts. Frustrated and needing money, Bone and Helen rob a bank, quickly becoming the most wanted criminals in Soleil. Creon attempts to blackmail Helen, but she dismisses his threats; before Creon can attack her, Bone saves her and tells Creon that he would kill him if he weren't leaving Soleil so soon. After losing faith in Jason's promises, Bone and Helen recruit J.D. and Alexi to help them escape.

On the run, Helen and Bone hide out in the plague zone, where they encounter Jason, who is revealed to be a government agent. Jason explains that the government long ago ended any major crime in Soleil, and it is his job to recruit citizens to go on government-sponsored crime sprees that validate the powers of the police state. Helen and Bone briefly take Jason hostage, then flee to a safer location, where they discuss plans to rob upper class citizens stored in the cryogenics facility and hijack military helicopters that Alexi can pilot to Frodan. Creon bullies J.D. into betraying Bone and Helen to the police, with whom he has made a deal. Bone kills his former boss at the facility, and Creon tries to take Helen hostage. However, the police arrive and betray Creon, as Helen warned him they would. Creon takes J.D. and Alexi hostage; when J.D. mocks him, Creon murders J.D.

At the military base, Helen and Bone, who escaped the facility, free Alexi and use Creon as a distraction as they hijack a helicopter. Creon begs to be taken with them, but they leave him behind for Jason to kill. Alexi flies Helen and Bone to Frodan, where they triumphantly land and celebrate their freedom. However, Frodan appears deserted, and Jason is waiting for them at the airfield. Jason casually murders Alexi and a police witness, then thanks Bone for making his plans possible. Jason reveals that everything has been a lie: Frodan is a radioactive wasteland, and the war ended twenty years ago; the "plague zone" is actually radiation that has drifted to Soleil. Jason knows too much for his position to be secure, and the information that Bone retrieved for him is his insurance. Jason allows Bone and Helen to escape, telling them that their continued threat justifies Soleil's military expenditures. Jason goes back to Soleil, while Helen and Bone start roaming and walking Frodan's land, searching for a new hope.

Cast 

 David Carradine as Jason
 Peter Nelson as 'Bone'
 Sherilyn Fenn as Helen
 Michael Shaner as Creon
 Orlando Sacha as Alexi
 Don Manor as J.D.
 Jorge Bustamante as Hector Beeko
  Diana Quijano as Sex Police

Production 
Executive producer Roger Corman, who came up with the film's concept, recruited Peruvian director Luis Llosa to make a futuristic thriller; Jeffrey Middents recounts what he calls an apocryphal story in which Corman signed a deal with Llosa while Corman was briefly delayed in a stopover in Peru. The film was shot in Peru and used postmodern architecture to affect a futuristic style. The extras were students and instructors from The American School of Lima. Llosa said he focused more on art direction than dialogue, and he shot at night to disguise the low budget. The film was a co-production between Corman's New Concorde and Llosa's Iguana Films.

Release 
Crime Zone was released in the United States by New Concorde in March 1989. MGM/UA released it on home video in May 1989. It was included in "Corman's Drive In", a subscription YouTube channel, in 2013.

Reception 
Academic Jeffrey Middents wrote that Crime Zone was better received in the United States than in its native Peru, whose critics rejected it as a Peruvian film. Middents states that the film was not rejected for being a genre film but instead because it did not have any uniquely Peruvian aspects, especially with its cast of American actors. Michael Wilmington of the Los Angeles Times criticized the film as humorless and grim, but he wrote that it rises above its low budget roots to become a competent Blade Runner clone. Drive-in movie critic Joe Bob Briggs wrote, "Sure, we've all seen this story before, but have we seen it with 1,000 Peruvian extras in shiny silver space suits? I think not."

References

External links
 
 

1989 films
1980s science fiction action films
Peruvian drama films
Peruvian science fiction films
Peruvian action films
American science fiction action films
English-language Peruvian films
American dystopian films
American post-apocalyptic films
Films set in a fictional country
Films shot in Peru
Films directed by Luis Llosa
Films with screenplays by Daryl Haney
1980s dystopian films
1980s English-language films
1980s Peruvian films
1980s American films